This is an episode list for the Canadian teen drama renegadepress.com. The series began airing on APTN in Canada. It lasted five seasons, from 2004 to 2008. A few years after the series finale aired, the show made its American debut on Starz Kids & Family in 2012.

Series overview

Episodes

Season 1 (2004)

Season 2 (2005)

Season 3 (2006)

Season 4 (2007)

Season 5 (2008)

References

External links
renegadepress.com 

Renegadepress